Snail Maze is a 1986 video game by Sega for the Master System. Instead of being released on a cartridge, it was built into the system's BIOS and could be played by starting the system without a game cartridge inserted and holding Up and buttons 1 and 2 simultaneously. Some later console models included a minimal BIOS because of memory constraints, and Snail Maze had to be removed. These systems instead included a built-in Alex Kidd in Miracle World or Sonic the Hedgehog. Snail Maze was never released in cartridge or card format.

Gameplay
A very simple game, Snail Maze involves navigating a small orange snail with a yellow shell through a blue maze. A goal area is clearly marked, which players must attempt to reach within a time limit. Despite its relative simplicity compared to other games of its era, Snail Maze could be quite challenging. Subsequent levels reduce the time available, giving a progressively lower margin for error.

Legacy
In 2004 an unofficial port of Snail Maze was made for the Japanese MSX computer platform with enhanced graphics and a new title screen. A version of Snail Maze was included on the Coleco Sonic handheld system, created in 2006. An unofficial port of Snail Maze was released in December 2015 for the TI-84 Plus CE graphing calculator, written in eZ80 assembly language. An emulated version of Snail Maze can be played on the in-game Master System in the 2021 game Lost Judgment by using the system without selecting a game.

References

External links
Master System screenshots

1986 video games
Master System games
Master System-only games
Maze games
MSX games
Sega video games
Video games developed in Japan
Single-player video games